The 1925 International cricket season was from April 1925 to September 1925.

Season overview

June

Wales in England

July

Scotland in Ireland

August

Foresters in Netherlands

Ireland in Wales

Dragonflies in Netherlands

September

MCC in Netherlands

References

1925 in cricket